Daniel Cohen,  (born 1963) is an English cinematographer. A member of the British Society of Cinematographers, he has worked on many feature films and television series, and is known for his collaborations with Tom Hooper, Stephen Frears, Shane Meadows, and Lenny Abrahamson. He has worked with Hooper on five occasions: Longford (2006), John Adams (2008), The King's Speech (2010), Les Misérables (2012), and The Danish Girl (2015). He was nominated for the Academy Award for Best Cinematography for The King's Speech, the BAFTA Award for Best Cinematography for Les Miserables, and the Primetime Emmy Award for Outstanding Cinematography for a Limited Series for John Adams.

Cinematography
 Dead Babies (2000)
 Ten Minutes Older: The Cello (segment "About Time 2") (2002)
 My Wrongs 8245–8249 & 117 (2002)
 Only Human (2004)
 Creep (2004)
 Dead Man's Shoes (2004)
 Festival (2005)
 Pierrepoint (2005)
 Scummy Man (2006)
 This Is England (2006)
 At the Apollo (2008)
 The Boat That Rocked (2009)
 Glorious 39 (2009)
 The King's Speech (2010)
 Johnny English Reborn (2011)
 Les Misérables (2012)
 X+Y (2014)
 London Road (2015)
 The Program (2015)
 Room (2015)
 The Danish Girl (2015)
 Florence Foster Jenkins (2016)
 Victoria & Abdul (2017)
 Disobedience (2017)
 Downhill (2020)
 Eurovision Song Contest: The Story of Fire Saga (2020)

Work on television
 The Book Group (2003)
 Nathan Barley (2005)
 Murder in Suburbia (2005)
 Longford (2006)
 Born Equal (2006)
 Coming Down the Mountain (2007)
 Joe's Palace (2007)
 Capturing Mary (2007)
 John Adams (2008)
 Poppy Shakespeare (2008)
 Dive (2010)
 This Is England '86 (2010)
 This Is England '88 (2011)
 Richard II (2012)
 Brexit: The Uncivil War (2019)

References

External links

United Agents profile

1963 births
Living people
British cinematographers
Film people from London